Kristijan Stanić (born 20 April 2001) is a Bosnian professional footballer who plays as winger for First League of FBiH club GOŠK Gabela, on loan from Zrinjski Mostar and both the Bosnia and Herzegovina U19 and Bosnia and Herzegovina U21 national teams.

Club career
Stanić was loaned to Croatian second tier side Solin in summer 2020 and to GOŠK Gabela in October 2020.

Career statistics

Club

Honours
Zrinjski Mostar
Bosnian Premier League: 2017–18

References

External links
Kristijan Stanić at whoscored.com

2001 births
Living people
Sportspeople from Mostar
Association football wingers
Bosnia and Herzegovina footballers
Bosnia and Herzegovina youth international footballers
Bosnia and Herzegovina under-21 international footballers
HŠK Zrinjski Mostar players
NK Solin players
NK GOŠK Gabela players
Premier League of Bosnia and Herzegovina players
First Football League (Croatia) players
First League of the Federation of Bosnia and Herzegovina players
Bosnia and Herzegovina expatriate footballers
Expatriate footballers in Croatia
Bosnia and Herzegovina expatriate sportspeople in Croatia